Tătăranu is a commune located in Vrancea County, Romania. It is composed of five villages: Bordeasca Nouă, Bordeasca Veche, Mărtinești, Tătăranu, and Vâjâitoarea.

The commune is located in the southeastern part of the county, on the banks of the Râmnicul Sărat River.

References

Communes in Vrancea County
Localities in Muntenia